Madie is an unincorporated community to the northeast of Ridgely, Tennessee, in Lake County, Tennessee, United States.

References 

Unincorporated communities in Lake County, Tennessee
Unincorporated communities in Tennessee